Chic Freak and More Treats is a studio album originally released in Japan in 1996 as a solo project by Nile Rodgers, and internationally re-issued as Chic in 2003.
The album contains re-interpretations of some of Chic's greatest hits and also some of the tracks produced by Rodgers and Bernard Edwards for David Bowie, Sister Sledge and Diana Ross.
Chic Freak and More Treats features guest vocals by Duran Duran's Simon Le Bon, Ashford & Simpson and Taja Sevelle and was to be Edwards' last studio project.

Track listing
All tracks written by Bernard Edwards and Nile Rodgers unless otherwise noted.
"Everybody Dance" (feat. Sylver Logan Sharp) – 5:05
"Dance Dance Dance" (feat. Sylver Logan Sharp) (Edwards, Kenny Lehman, Rodgers) – 4:38
"Let's Dance" (feat. Christopher Max) (David Bowie) – 4:43
"Le Freak" (feat. Sylver Logan Sharp) – 4:35
"Upside Down" (feat. Ashford & Simpson) – 3:44
"Do That Dance" (feat. Simon Le Bon, Sylver Logan Sharp, The Crowell Sisters) (Le Bon, Garrett Oliver, Tanya Ramtulla, Rodgers) – 3:56
"He's the Greatest Dancer" (feat. Taja Sevelle) – 4:18
"Good Times" (feat. Sylver Logan Sharp) – 4:48
"I Want Your Love" (feat. Sylver Logan Sharp) – 5:26
"Music Is My House" (feat. Christopher Max & Sylver Logan Sharp) (Oliver, Rodgers) – 4:09
"We Are Family" (feat. Sylver Logan Sharp) – 5:54
"Do That Dance" (Dancehall Rap) (feat. Wayne Thompson) (Le Bon, Oliver, Ramtulla, Rodgers) – 3:51
"Just One World" (feat. Christopher Max & Sylver Logan Sharp) (Gordon, Oliver, Rodgers) – 4:20

Personnel
 Ashford & Simpson (Nickolas Ashford & Valerie Simpson) – lead vocals (track 5) 
 The Crowell Sisters – lead vocals (track 6)
 Simon Le Bon – lead vocals (track 6)
 Christopher Max – lead vocals (tracks 3, 10, 13)
 Taja Sevelle – lead vocals (track 7)
 Sylver Logan Sharp – lead vocals (tracks 1, 2, 4, 8-10, 13)
 Wayne Thompson – rapping (track 12)
 Christine Gordon – backing vocals
 Suzette Henry – backing vocals
 Jill Jones – backing vocals
 Audra Lomax Parker – backing vocals
 Tanya Ramtulla – backing vocals
 Nile Rodgers – guitar, backing vocals
 Bernard Edwards – bass guitar
 Chazz Oliver – keyboards, programming
 Richard Hilton – keyboards, programming
 Omar Hakim – drums

Production
 Nile Rodgers – producer
 Chazz Oliver – producer
 Gary Tole – sound engineer
 Alec Head – additional engineer
 Carl Glanville – additional engineer
 Richard Hilton – additional engineer
 Roger Arnold – additional engineer
 Recorded at Le Crib, Sony Studios and Right Track Recording
 Mixed at Right Track Recording by Gary Tole, Pat Dillett, Larry Alexander
 Mastering by Howie Weinberg at Masterdisk NYC

References

1996 albums
2003 albums
Chic (band) albums
Albums produced by Nile Rodgers